
Gmina Szlichtyngowa is an urban-rural gmina (administrative district) in Wschowa County, Lubusz Voivodeship, in western Poland.

Villages
Apart from the town of Szlichtyngowa, Gmina Szlichtyngowa contains the villages and settlements of Dryżyna, Gola, Górczyna, Jędrzychowice, Kowalewo, Małe Drzewce, Nowe Drzewce, Puszcza, Stare Drzewce, Wyszanów and Zamysłów.

Neighbouring gminas
Gmina Szlichtyngowa is bordered by the gminas of Głogów, Kotla, Niechlów, Pęcław, Sława and Wschowa.

References

Szlichtyngowa
Wschowa County